The 2010 Oaxaca earthquake struck Oaxaca, Mexico on June 30, 2010, with an  magnitude of 6.3. Many people in different cities left their beds and ran into the street, as the quake struck at 2:22 am. Helicopters and police vehicles were sent to inspect possible damage in Mexico City, primarily in downtown and central areas, where some buildings were evacuated. In Mexico City, some cases of power outage in Azcapotzalco, Iztapalapa, and Benito Juárez and cracks in buildings were reported. 1 person died in San Andrés Huaxpaltepec, Oaxaca.

See also
List of earthquakes in 2010
List of earthquakes in Mexico
Hurricane Alex (2010)

References

External links
 

2010 earthquakes
2010 Oaxaca
2010 in Mexico
June 2010 events in Mexico
2010 disasters in Mexico